Johan David Kristoffersson (born 6 December 1988) is a Swedish racecar driver. He is a five time World Champion having won the FIA World Rallycross Championship in 2017, 2018, 2020, 2021 and 2022. In 2018 he won a record breaking 11 out of 12 events in the championship. He is the son of former racing driver and Kristoffersson Motorsport (KMS) team owner Tommy Kristoffersson. He also won the Superstars Series championship in 2012, the same year in which he claimed the Scandinavian Touring Car Championship and Porsche Carrera Cup Scandinavia titles.

Racing career

Early career
Kristoffersson competed for his father's team in Junior Touring Car Championship in 2008. He finished fourth in the championship, after winning two races during the season, in a Volkswagen. KMS also competed in the Swedish Touring Car Championship, which he had to move up to the year 2009. He did not take any points in the main series, but finished second behind Viktor Hallrup in the Semcon Cup, a private preparatory cup. During the 2010 season Kristoffersson drove for Team Biogas.se for three race weekends.

Touring Cars
Kristoffersson's breakthrough came in the 2011 season. It was to the races on the Falkenbergs Motorbana that he got to drive a third car for Team Biogas.se in Scandinavian Touring Car Championship. He was high up there, but had to retire both races. He then picked three fourth places in the four subsequent races, before he took a third place in the second race on the Ring Knutstorp. He then took another third place at Mantorp Park and finished the season in tenth place overall, despite the fact that he only drove just over half the season. 

In 2011 Kristoffersson also drove in the Porsche Carrera Cup Scandinavia, where he fought for the title with Robin Rudholm. During the last race weekend, he had a good chance at the title, but lost it after receiving a penalty for a false start in the first race. Kristofferson won the second race, but still could not win the championship, then Rudholm finished second and had too big a lead in the overall driver's championship.

During the 2012 season, Kristoffersson competed in the Italian-based Touring Car Championship, Superstars Series, for Kristoffersson Motorsport under the name Audi Sport KMS. He took five titles in a single year – winning Porsche Carrera Cup Scandinavia, STCC and Superstars Series in all three categories (Italian, International and Rookie).

Kristoffersson joined the Petri Corse team for the 2013 Superstars Series season where he drove a Porsche Panamera.

Also in 2013, the Swede drove a family-run Volkswagen Scirocco at a European Rallycross Championship round. 

On 20 December 2018, it was announced that Kristofferson will join Volkswagen for the 2019 World Touring Car Cup season, partnering team's regulars Mehdi Bennani and Rob Huff.

Rally and Rallycross
In 2014 he raced part-time at the FIA World Rallycross Championship with a Kristofferson Volkswagen Polo, finishing third at Belgium. In 2015, he won at Portugal and claimed podiums at UK, Spain, Turkey and Italy, finishing third in the standings.

In 2016, KMS and Marklund merged their Volkswagen factory teams, with Kristoffersson driving a Polo. He claimed a win, three podiums and nine top six finishes, and was runner-up in the Supercars overall standings behind Mattias Ekström.

In 2019 Kristofferson would also make the switch over to rallying, running a full-time campaign with Volkswagen in the Swedish Rally Championship with his WRX team Kristoffersson Motorsport, using the Volkswagen Polo GTI R5. 

He won the 2018 WRX title with a record-breaking 11 out of 12 event wins during the season. 

 

He won the 2017, 2018, 2020 and 2021 FIA World Rallycross Championship, making him a 4 Time World Champion.

He will participate in the 2022 FIA World Rallycross Championship in a Kristoffersson Motorsport run Electric Volkswagen.

Extreme E
Kristofferson joined Rosberg X Racing in Extreme E for its inaugural season and drove alongside Australian Molly Taylor. They Won the Championship even though Team X44's drivers 9X World Rally Champion Sébastien Loeb and Spanish driver Cristina Gutiérrez finished level on points with them, as RXR had 3 Wins to X44's 1 Win.

He re signed with RXR for the 2022 Extreme E Championship and will drive for them alongside fellow Swede Mikaela Åhlin-Kottulinsky. They won the first round of the season in Neom, Saudi Arabia.

Racing record

Complete Swedish Touring Car Championship results
(key) (Races in bold indicate pole position) (Races in italics indicate fastest lap)

Complete Scandinavian Touring Car Championship results
(key) (Races in bold indicate pole position) (Races in italics indicate fastest lap)

Complete International Superstars Series results
(key) (Races in bold indicate pole position) (Races in italics indicate fastest lap)

Complete FIA European Rallycross Championship results
(key)

Supercar/RX1

Complete FIA World Rallycross Championship results
(key)

Supercar/RX1/RX1e

Complete WRC results
(key)

* Season still in progress.

WRC-2 Results
(key)

WRC-3 Results
(key)

* Season still in progress.

Complete World Touring Car Cup results
(key) (Races in bold indicate pole position) (Races in italics indicate fastest lap)

Complete Extreme E results
(key)

References

External links 

 
 John Christopher's blog on kms-racing.com

1988 births
Living people
Swedish racing drivers
Superstars Series drivers
Swedish Touring Car Championship drivers
World Rallycross Championship drivers
World Touring Car Cup drivers
Extreme E drivers
People from Arvika Municipality
Sportspeople from Värmland County
24H Series drivers
World Rally Championship drivers
European Rallycross Championship drivers
Swedish rally drivers
Team Rosberg drivers
Sébastien Loeb Racing drivers
Dreyer & Reinbold Racing drivers
Phoenix Racing drivers
Volkswagen Motorsport drivers
Porsche Carrera Cup Germany drivers